A product recall is a request from a manufacturer to return a product after the discovery of safety issues or product defects that might endanger the consumer or put the maker/seller at risk of legal action.

The recall is an effort to limit ruination of the corporate image and limit liability for corporate negligence, which can cause significant legal costs. It can be difficult, if not impossible, to determine how costly can be releasing to the consumer a product that could endanger someone's life and the economic loss resulting from unwanted publicity. Recalls are costly. Costs include having to handle the recalled product, replacing it and possibly being held financially responsible for the consequences of the recalled product.

A country's consumer protection laws will have specific requirements in regard to product recalls. Such regulations may include how much of the cost the maker will have to bear, situations in which a recall is compulsory (usually because the risk is big enough), or penalties for failure to recall. The firm may also initiate a recall voluntarily, perhaps subject to the same regulations as if the recall were compulsory.

General steps to a product recall
A product recall usually involves the following steps, which may differ according to local laws:  
 Maker or dealer notifies the authorities responsible of their intention to recall a product. In some cases the government can also request a recall of a product. Consumer hotlines or other communication channels are established. The scope of the recall, that is, which serial numbers or batch numbers etc. are recalled, is often specified.
 Product recall announcements are released on the respective government agency's website (if applicable), as well as in paid notices in the metropolitan daily newspapers. In some circumstances, heightened publicity will also result in news television reports advising of the recall.
 When a consumer group learns of a recall it will also notify the public by various means.
 Typically, the consumer is advised to return the goods, regardless of condition, to the seller for a full refund or modification.
 Avenues for possible consumer compensation will vary depending on the specific laws governing consumer trade protection and the cause of recall.

Highlights of  major product recalls (1958-present)

1959
USA 1959-60 Cadillacs.

1973
UK (August 1973): The Triumph Toledo, Triumph 1500 and Triumph Dolomite were the subject of the UK's largest vehicle recall to date.  The recall affected 103,000 cars and involved the replacement of a front radius strut in the front suspension assembly, addressing a risk that the component might break and render the car impossible to steer.  The manufacturers stated they had replicated the alleged defect by driving the car into a solid kerb at between 10 and 15 mph (16–24 km/h).  Despite undertaking the recall, they insisted that the condition could only "arise through misuse".
 USA (August 1973): The Little Wonder TV antenna was recalled by the CPSC. It was one of the earliest recalls of an electronic device. The product connected the antenna terminals on the back of the TV directly to the AC mains.

1978
 
 USA (June 9, 1978) The Ford Motor Company recalled 1.5 million Ford Pintos, the largest recall in automotive history at that time, to install a modification to reduce the risk of fire.

1982
USA (October 1982): Tylenol Scare of 1982
USA (late 1982): McDonald's recalled 10 million Playmobil Happy Meal toys due to the risk of choking hazards.

1986
USA (1986): 1986 Excedrin Tampering. A few bottles of Excedrin were poisoned with cyanide. 2 people died, and 1 recovered in the hospital. A woman named Stella Nickell was charged with product tampering, attempted murder and murder. She was sentenced to 90 years in prison.

1994
Worldwide (1994): Intel recalled the original Pentium processors due to the Pentium FDIV bug.
USA (October 1994): Over 500,000 Santa Barney Pom-Pom plush toys recalled due to choking and fire hazard.

1999
Worldwide (late 1999) Audi recalled the original Audi TT Mk1 both Coupé and Roadster due to crashes and related fatalities that occurred at speeds in excess of 180 kilometres per hour (110 mph), during abrupt lane changes or sharp turns.

2000
USA (Early 2000): Burger King organized a recall of 25 million plastic container toys resembling Poké Balls as they presented a suffocation hazard. 
USA: January 14: S. C. Johnson & Son issued a recall on their allergen spray product AllerCare at the request of the U.S. Environmental Protection Agency, after reports of asthma attacks and related medical incidents associated with the product.
Taco shells manufactured for Taco Bell recalled 
USA (May 2000): Ford Motor Company's handling of the recall of the 6.5 million 15-inch Firestone tires fitted to the Ford Explorer SUV soon culminated in the resignation of Ford's CEO at the time, Jacques Nasser. (See Firestone vs Ford Motor Company controversy.)

2001
USA: March 5: McDonald's recalled 234,000 of the Scooter Bug Happy Meal toys distributed between November 2000 to February 2001, due to the risk of choking hazards.
Worldwide: August 8: Bayer Pharmaceuticals pulled the cholesterol drug Baycol from the market after 31 deaths were linked to the drug in the United States, as well as the risk of rhabdomyolysis, a condition that is known to cause muscle destruction.

2003
Australia (April 2003): The recall of a variety of goods manufactured by Pan Pharmaceuticals as a result of failures in quality assurance and standards. The company was soon put under receivership.

2004
USA: February 16: General Motors recalled several 1998-2000 Buick LeSabre, Park Avenue, and Pontiac Bonneville models, as well as 1998-99 Oldsmobile 88, 2000 Chevrolet Impala and Chevrolet Monte Carlo models equipped with 3800 (L36) engines. The fuel pressure regulators in these vehicles, made by Delphi Technologies, had a higher rate of fuel leaks that entered the intake manifold, posing a fire hazard.
USA: July 8: About 150 million pieces of jewelry obtained from vending machines were recalled due to the risk of lead poisoning.
Worldwide: September 30: Merck voluntarily withdraws the COX-2 inhibitor drug Vioxx from the market after several studies linked it to heart attacks and other adverse effects.

2005
United Kingdom and Canada (February 2005): Potentially carcinogenic Sudan I food colouring was found in over 400 products containing Worcester sauce and had to be recalled.
Worldwide:June 2005: Engine stalls linked to faulty wirings on 6.0L Powerstroke Diesel engines have caused hundreds of thousands of 2004-2005 Ford Super Duty, Excursion, and Econoline models to be recalled.
Worldwide: June 17: The Guidant Corporation recalled over 50,000 defibrillators due to the risk of device malfunctions as a result of an electrical flaw. Prior to the recall, it was reported that several models failed 45 times and caused at least 2 deaths through the end of May.

2006
March 2006: About 300,000 Reebok heart-shaped charm bracelets were recalled after a child died from lead poisoning after swallowing a piece from one of the charms.
Ireland and United Kingdom (24 June 2006): Cadbury-Schweppes announced that there had been a salmonella scare surrounding its products, causing millions of chocolate bars from stores across Ireland and the UK to be recalled.
2006 Sony notebook computer batteries recall:
Worldwide: August 2006: Dell recalls over four million notebook computer batteries, after several instances where the batteries, made by Sony, overheated or caught fire. Most of the defective notebooks were sold in the US, however, some one million faulty batteries could be found elsewhere in the world.
August 2006: Following Dell's battery recall Apple Computer also recalls 1.8 million notebook computer batteries manufactured by Sony. Similar to Dell, most of the notebooks were sold in the United States. However, some 700,000 units could be found overseas.
September 2006: Matsushita (Panasonic) recalls 6,000 batteries.
September 2006: Toshiba recalls 340,000 batteries.
September 2006: IBM/Lenovo recalls 500,000 batteries.
October 2006: Hitachi recalls 16,000 batteries.
October 2006: Fujitsu recalls 338,000 batteries.
October 2006: Sharp recalls 28,000 batteries.
November 2006: Casio recalls more than 20,000 batteries
December 2006: Nintendo said it would voluntarily replace 3.2 million straps attached to the controllers of its new Wii game consoles, and recalled about 200,000 AC adapters for its DS and DS Lite handheld game machines. The Wii strap failures are a global problem.

2007
Worldwide: February: Lenovo and Sanyo recalls 200,000 batteries.
North America: March: Menu Foods and several other companies issue numerous pet food recalls.
USA: March: Ford Motor Company recalls new 2008 Super Duty after reported tailpipe fires in the diesel version.
Japan: March: Casio recalls About 12,000 units of the Electronic keyboards with the Problems being overheated, Causing a Fire Hazard. The information was Revised in 2009 by the Consumer Product Safety Commission (CPSC) after recalling about 20,000 batteries from their old keyboards Last year.
USA: April: Nestlé voluntarily recalled its "Caramel Kit Kat Chunky" bars and "KitKat Cookie Dough Chocolate" bars due to some bits of hard plastic being found in the chocolate.
USA: June: Foreign Tire Sales Inc. recalls tires imported from Hangzhou Zhongce Rubber Co., of Hangzhou, China.  The tires were not made to safety standards to prevent tread separation, a problem that led to the nation's largest tire recall in 2000 by Ford Motor Company.  Foreign Tire Sales Inc., was unable to comply with the recall due to its limited resources. Further, Hangzhou Zhongce Rubber doesn't have accountability for a recall since the company is based solely in China and sells in the US through third-party re-sellers.
Worldwide: June: The Thomas and Friends Wooden Railway toys were recalled due to risks of lead poisoning from the paint used on the train cars and locomotives included in the toys. An additional recall was also conducted in September 2007.
USA: July 13: Gerber recalled Organic Rice Cereal and Organic Oatmeal Cereal after a Tampa, Florida parent, Richard Andree, found approximately 30 hard chunks, some of which were a half inch long in the product.
Worldwide: August 14: Nokia recalled 46 Million BL-5C batteries after a primary investigation which revealed faulty manufactured batteries by Matsushita Electric Corporation which could explode after short circuit.
USA: August 30: Some organic chocolates made in China were recalled because of worms found inside the chocolate.
USA: October: ground beef from the Topps Meat Company of Elizabeth, New Jersey was recalled. , this was the second-largest beef recall in United States history.
Worldwide: September: Honda Motor Co issued a recall of 182,756 2006-2007 Honda Civic sedans and coupes for wheel bearings
Worldwide: October: Alltrade Tools recalled over 800,000 power tool chargers.
USA: October: Several U.S. Pharmaceutical companies voluntarily recalled several infant cough and cold medicines due to possible overdosing dangers.
Worldwide: November: A popular children's toy, Bindeez (also known as Aqua Dots, in the United States), was recalled when it was discovered that 1,4-butanediol had been substituted for 1,5-pentanediol in the bead manufacturing process. The human body metabolises the substance to form the anesthetic GHB.
USA: November: Children's snow and sand castle kits by Paricon, sold exclusively at L. L. Bean, were recalled due to sharp edges.
Worldwide: November: About 175,000 Curious George 12-inch plush dolls with plastic faces were recalled due to the risk of lead exposure and poisoning.

2008
February 2008: The USDA recalled 143 million pounds of processed frozen beef (the largest beef recall in US history) from the Westland/Hallmark processor in Southern California due to cattle not being inspected before slaughter. There was little chance of any illness in the cattle.
April 2008: Malt-O-Meal voluntarily recalls its Puffed Rice and Puffed Wheat cold cereal products due to salmonella contamination.
1 April 2008: Malaysia's first nationwide automotive recall was announced due to defects in the Proton Savvy's rear wheel bearing.
August 2008: Maple Leaf Foods voluntarily recalled a number of meat and deli products after an outbreak of listeriosis.  Four elderly people have died as a result.  Affected restaurants include McDonald's and Mr. Sub.
September 2008: 440,000 Sony VAIO type T TZ series due to excessive heat production, produced in May 2007 - July 2008 had to be recalled.

2009
January - Peanut Corporation of America recalled its bulk peanut butter and peanut paste products for salmonella contamination. Because of the myriad of consumer items PCA's bulk products went into, the Food and Drug Administration eventually recalled 3913 different products from at least 361 companies - one of the most extensive food recalls in US history. On February 13, 2009, Peanut Corporation of America filed for Chapter 7 Liquidation following the massive extensive peanut butter recall. In September 2015, Stewart Parnell, who was the CEO of PCA at the time of the 2009 peanut butter recall, pleaded guilty to 70 felony charges of wire fraud and mail fraud. He was sentenced to 28 years in prison for mishandling the peanut butter recall in 2009 and for the felony wire fraud and mail fraud charges.
March - Setton Pistachio of Terra Bella, California recalled its entire 2008 crop of pistachios due to salmonella contamination.
June - 300,000 packages of Nestlé's Toll House cookie dough are recalled due to possible E. coli contamination that made several consumers sick, when the dough was eaten raw.
October - some Acer Aspire laptops were recalled for overheating problems.
December - virtually every Roman blind and roller shade on the market—around 50 million sets—were recalled because the cords pose a strangulation hazard to children.

2010
January - Toyota recalls several million vehicles because of faulty throttle pedals that may cause runaway acceleration and faulty software that may cause braking to be delayed.
USA: March: - Carter's, Inc. recalls infant clothing and zippers due to Choking Hazard
May - Johnson & Johnson recalls 43 over-the-counter children's medicines made by McNeil Consumer Healthcare, a subsidiary of Johnson & Johnson, on April 30, 2010.
June - Maytag recalls about 1.7 million dishwashers, including Maytag(r), Jenn-Air(r), Magic Chef(r), and several other brands due to the electrical failure and fire hazards.
June - Ikea recalled 3.36 million "roller" and "roman" shades due to strangulation hazards.
June - McDonald's recalled the Shrek Forever After drinking glasses due to risks of cadmium poisoning from the glass' paint.
June - Kellogg issued a voluntary recall of select packages of Kellogg's Corn Pops, Honey Smacks, Froot Loops and Apple Jacks cereals due to "an uncharacteristic waxy-like taste and smell" caused by an unnamed substance in the package liners. The taste of the contaminated boxes was described as "stale, metal, and soap-like" by consumers.
July - Perdue Farms recalls over 90,000 pounds of chicken nuggets after bits of blue plastic were found in the nuggets.
August - 228 million eggs are voluntarily recalled by Wright County Egg of Galt, Iowa due to a potential salmonella contamination.
September - Fisher Price recalls 10-million products, including enough toys to merit this as the largest toy recall in history.
September 23 - Similac Abbott Laboratories issued a voluntary recall of up to 5 million containers of Similac infant formula after finding beetles in the formula. ISSUE: Possibility of the presence of a small common beetle in the product. While the  U.S. Food and Drug Administration (FDA) determined that the formula containing these beetles posed no immediate health risk, there was a possibility that infants who consumed the formula could experience symptoms of gastrointestinal discomfort and refusal to eat as a result of small insect parts irritating the GI tract. The voluntary recall affected milk- and soy-based formulas distributed in the United States, Puerto Rico, Guam, and some Caribbean nations. At least 12 of the recalled products were provided to families through the federal government's Women, Infants, and Children (WIC) health and nutrition program. The FDA reassured caregivers and families whose babies may have consumed these products that drinking the formula will not cause long-term health problems.

2011
January - Nature's Promise Giant Food of Landover, Md. issued a voluntary recall of several Nature's Promise organic bagged salad items due to the potential for listeria contamination. there was a report of a pregnant woman in her 20s being rushed to the hospital after eating tainted salad. No deaths reported.
February - U.S. Consumer Product Safety Commission issued a recall 20,000 of Sniglar Cribs, distributed by IKEA Home Furnishings due to the detach and collapse of the Mattress, creating a risk of entrapment and suffocation to a child in the crib.
February - Honda Motor Co issued a voluntary safety recall of 700,000 cars due to the failure. The spring was placed improperly in a small box inside the engine, so that, in some cases, the problem could cause the engine to stall. No crashes or injuries have been reported related to this defect.
February - Study on Medical device recall by Dr. Diana Zuckerman and Paul Brown of the National Research Center for Women and Families, and Dr. Steven Nissen of the Cleveland Clinic, published in the Archives of Internal Medicine, showed that most medical devices recalled in the last five years for “serious health problems or death” had been previously approved by the U.S. Food and Drug Administration (FDA) using the less stringent, and cheaper, 501(k) process.
March - Toyota Motor Corp issued a recall about 22,000 sport utility vehicles and pickup trucks over tire-deflation monitoring systems that could cause failure. No such crashes or injuries were reported.
March - Dairy Crest  recalled one batch of its Frijj Thick and Fresh Strawberry milkshake due to low levels of listeria.
May - Nestlé Philippines recalled two batches of Maggi beef and chicken noodles after it was reported that it was contaminated with salmonella.
June 28, 2011 - McNeil Consumer Healthcare, a division of McNEIL-PPC, Inc., recalled at the retail level one product lot (60,912 bottles) of Tylenol, Extra Strength Caplets, 225 count bottles, manufactured in February 2009 and distributed in the U.S. McNeil took this action following a small number of reports of musty, moldy, or other odor. The uncharacteristic smell has been linked to the presence of trace amounts of a chemical known as 2,4,6-tribromoanisole (TBA). Tylenol, Extra Strength Caplets, 225 count Lot # ABA619 with UPC Code 300450444271.
August - National Beef Packing Company recalled about 60,424 pounds of ground beef products contaminated with E. coli O157:H7 (the most well-known of the enteropathogenic strains).
November - Apple, Inc announced a recall of all first generation iPod nanos sold between September 2005 and December 2006 due to the battery overheating and posing a fire risk. 
December - Tyson Fresh Meats (part of Tyson Foods) recalled 40 thousand pounds of ground beef in sixteen states. A sample of the 80/20 Ground Beef Chuck produced on 24 October tested positive for E. coli at the company's Nebraska plant.
December - Tech For Kids recalled snow bikes due to the risk of a fall hazard.

2012
March - Imported Frescolina brand ricotta salata cheese was recalled after at least three of fourteen people sickened by it (diagnosed between Mar. 28 and Aug. 30 in 11 states) died.
September - Trader Joe's and SunLand peanut butter products were recalled due to a salmonella scare.
October - New England Compounding Center recalled all its products. Contaminated medications caused meningitis outbreak.
November- Kenny's farmhouse 4 cheeses were recalled due to listeria.
November- Nestlé's Nesquik powder was recalled due to salmonella risk.

2013
USA: February: Kellogg Company recalls over 30,000 boxes of Special K Red Berries cereal due to glass fragments.
USA: March: - Toys R Us recalls Bell cycling helmets due to faulty strap buckles that could pose a head injury risk in an accident
USA: March: - Honda recalls 183,000 vehicles due to concerns that they could brake unexpectedly due to a fault in their electronic stability control systems. A further 381,000 vehicles in the US and worldwide were recalled later in the year due to the same issue.
USA: July: Big Lots recalled Christmas tree lights due to fire hazard. 
Worldwide: August: - Sleepharmony recalls pink beds due to lead levels in their paint exceeding limits under US consumer law.
Worldwide: September: Pillsbury Company recalled Cinnamon Rolls due to plastic pieces in the cinnamon rolls.
October - Kids II, Inc. recalled 400,000 Baby Einstein Musical Motion Activity Jumpers due to the risk of an impact hazard.
October - Hachette Book Group recalled 70,000 children's books due to the risk of choking and laceration hazards.
Worldwide: December: - Michelin recalls 1.2m tires fitted as original equipment to the Ford E-Series and other Ford trucks and sedans due to reports of the tire treads separating from the belt causing damage to the vehicles

2014
April - IKEA recalled 255,000 children's bed canopies due to the risk of strangulation hazards.
April - Walmart recalled 174,000 My Sweet Love Cuddle Care baby dolls due to the risk of a burn hazard.
April - Playtex recalled 305,000 infant carriers due to the risk of a fall hazard.
May - Office Depot recalled 1.4 million office chairs due to the risk of a fall hazard.
November 2014, McDonald's recalled 2.3 million Hello Kitty birthday-themed plastic figure Happy Meal toys holding a pink heart-shaped lollipop including a red plastic toy whistle that was due to the risk of a choking hazard.
November 13, 2014; Panasonic recalls 300,000 batteries.
December 2014, Graco recalled 4.7 million strollers due to the risk of a laceration and amputation hazard.
December 2014, Toys R Us recalled 19,000 Koala children's sandals with butterfly wings due to the risk of a choking hazard.

2015
On May 19, 2015, Takata announces the recall of 34 million air-bags, which is one of the largest auto defects of all time.
In May 2015, Lee's Sandwiches recalled  of beef, pork, and chicken produced at its Garden Grove, California, facility, due to an investigation by the federal Food Safety and Inspection Service into meat that was falsely stamped with another facility's inspection mark.
On 3 June 2015, the Beats Pill XL speaker has been recalled due to fire hazard.
In Summer 2015, Apple, Inc. recalled over 500,000 iMac computers due to an issue where the computer crashes and wipes the hard drive
In November 2015, Hotpoint and Indesit began alerting consumers about customers who purchased a tumble dryer between 2004 and 2015 because of the risk of fluff and lint building up around the heating element and presenting a severe fire hazard.

2016
  
 On 23 February 2016, Mars Incorporated recalled chocolate from 55 different countries, after a German customer found plastic in a Snickers bar in February.
 In April 2016, CRF Frozen Foods recalled over 400 frozen food products due to listeria outbreak that sickened 8 people.
 April, 2016, Pilgrim's Pride recalled more than 4.5 million pounds of fully cooked chicken products due to contamination of wood, metal, plastic, and rubber.
 May 27, 2016, Maruti Suzuki recalled 75,419 units of the Baleno hatchback (petrol and diesel) to upgrade its airbag controller software of which 17,231 units are exports.
 May 31, 2016, General Mills recall of flour that sickened people with pathogenic E. coli, eventually reaching 45 million pounds, begins.
 June, 2016, SunOpta recalled dozens of products based on sunflower seeds due to Listeria concerns.
 July 6, 2016, IKEA recalled all their chocolate candy products due to undeclared allergen contamination. Samples analyzed were found to contain undeclared milk, almond, and hazelnut.
 July 15, 2016, ConAgra recalls 200,000 pounds of frozen P. F. Chang's meals due to metal fragments.
 August 2016, McDonald's recalled over 30 million of the Happy Meal Fitness Activity Tracker bands due to risks of skin irritation and burns.
 September 2, 2016, Samsung recalled 2.5 million Galaxy Note 7 phones due to batteries catching fire or exploding during charging, just after 2 weeks of sale.
 September 9, 2016, General Motors recalled over 4 million vehicles (brands such as Buick, Chevrolet, GMC and Cadillac) after an air bag software defect kills one person and injures three people.
 September 11, 2016, Nissan recalled 134,000 Maxima and Murano vehicles due to fire hazard.
 September 18, 2016, Koffee Kup Bakery recalled 99,000 bread products after consumers reported that there are some clear plastic pieces in some products.
 September 19/20, 2016, Kellogg Company recalled voluntarily 10,000 cases of Nutri-Grain Whole Wheat Waffles due to listeria concerns.
 September 21, 2016, Blue Bell Creameries recalled all of their Cookie Dough ice cream products after two flavors of the Cookie Dough ice cream were contaminated with traces of the Listeria virus leading to the deaths of three people and hospitalization of two other people.
 October 10, 2016, Kraft Heinz recalled the Lunchables Ham and Cheese Stackers products due to misbranding and undeclared allergens.
 October 10, 2016, Mars, Incorporated recalled Cesar Classics filet mignon dog food after a customer found small plastic pieces in the product.
 October 11, 2016 Samsung stopped production of the problematic Galaxy Note 7 devices for nine months and have recalled the supposedly "safe" devices because they were still catching fire or exploding
 November 19, 2016, Taylor Farms recalled 57 varieties of hummus produced under the Sabra brand name due to Listeria concerns.
 December 2, 2016 Valley Milk Products of Strasburg, Virginia recalled all its products after armed US Marshals seized over 4 million pounds of dry milk and buttermilk powder adulterated with Salmonella Meleagridis. Valley Milk had resisted the FDA's request to do a voluntary recall.

2017
 January 16, 2017: Ford South Africa and the country's National Consumer Commission (NCC) announced a safety recall affecting 4 556 Ford Kuga vehicles, following a series of fires.
 June 22, 2017: Mazda North American Operations and the National Highway Traffic Safety Administration (NHTSA) issued a recall for 227,814 Mazda 3s and Mazda 6s after finding problems with their parking brake calipers.
 November 2017: About 37.8 million fire extinguishers were recalled by Kidde due to failure to discharge.

2018
 February 5, 2018: IKEA recalled all of their Ikea brand marshmallow candy (GODIS PÅSKKYCKLING) due to possible bacteria contamination from mice infestation. All customers were advised to return them to the nearest IKEA store or discard them immediately. 
 July 11, 2018: IKEA recalled their IKEA brand (LURVIG) pet water dispensers due to a suffocation hazard to pets. Customers were advised to discontinue use and return the pet water dispensers to the nearest IKEA store.  
 July 21, 2018: Kellogg's recalled boxes of Honey Smacks due to 73 cases of salmonella. Kellogg Company and Food and Drug Administration (FDA) had a voluntary recall on the cereals and its boxes.  
 July 24, 2018: Cadillac issued a recall on all Cadillac CT6 vehicles that were manufactured between September 4, 2015, and September 21, 2017, due to an excess adhesive interfering with the lower LATCH child restraint anchors. Owners of affected vehicles were recommended to install child restraints with the seat belts until the recall is repaired from the lower LATCH child restraint anchors.
 October 14, 2018: PepsiCo had recalled the Tropicana Trop50 Multi-Vitamin juice containers and its drink. The company previously recalled Pepsi 16.9-ounce bottles due to a parts failure in the manufacturing process. And in the UK, They have recalled Doritos Chili Heatwave crisps because they contain undisclosed milk. American supermarket chains Whole Foods, Walmart, ShopRite and Trader Joe's asked PepsiCo about the recall on the Trop50 bottles.
North America: December 10, 2018:  Both Danone and Hiland Dairy brands are recalling products for allergy alerts. Danone North America is recalling its Light & Fit Greek Crunch S'mores flavor, and Hiland Dairy is recalling its half-gallon Whole Chocolate Milk, both for an allergy alert.

2019
April 23: Flying Tiger Copenhagen recalls some Wooden train carts because the steam dome on the toy train's engine car can come loose, causing a choking hazard.
July 8: Disney Store recalls all Forky 11 inch plushies because the googly eyes could detach, causing a choking hazard, 15 days after Toy Story 4 came out.
September 16: General Mills announced it will recall all 5 lb bags of Gold Mebal Unbleached All Purpose Flour with a better if used by date of September 6, 2020. Consumers were reminded that flour is not a 'ready to eat' ingredient. Guidance from Food and Drug Administration (FDA) and Centers for Disease Control (CDC) continues to warn that consumers should refrain from consuming any raw products made with flour.
 Worldwide: December 13: Ford Motor Company recalls all the Super Duty 2017-2019 models Super-Crew Pick-ups due to fire concerns.
United Kingdom and Ireland, 18 December: Whirlpool announced a second recall for Hotpoint and Indesit as certain washing machines manufactured between 2014 and 2018 because of a faulty door lock which can overheat and create a risk of fire.
December 30: Shortly before New Year's Eve, Central Valley Meat Co. recalls ground beef products due to possible Salmonella Dublin contamination.

2020
 UK: January 26: Cow & Gate and Tesco are recalling 15 types of baby food jars as a "precautionary measure" amid concerns some may have been tampered with.
 USA: July 23: Target recalls Manhattan Teether toy due to risks of Choking hazard. ISSUE: U.S. Consumer Product Safety Commission is asking the people who bought the item to keep the toy away from children and return it to any Target store for a full refund.
 Europe: September: Sesame seeds contamination by ethylene oxide.
 Philippines: September 10: The Philippine National Telecommunications Commission issued an order to recall frequencies and channels  assigned to ABS-CBN, citing the absence of the latter's valid, legislative franchise.
 Canada: October: Certain lots of Cottonelle-branded flushable wipes were recalled due to being contaminated with Pluralibacter gergoviae.

2021
 USA: January 4: Target recalls 181,000 Cat and Jack children's swimsuits due to the snaps breaking causing a choking hazard.
 USA: January: 700,000 Hot Pockets were recalled due to bits of glass and plastic being reported in the pockets.
 USA: April: U.S. officials recall and suspend the use of the Johnson and Johnson coronavirus vaccine due to blood clots being reported in women who received the vaccine.
 USA: April 10: The Food and Drug Administration stated that Hostess announced a recall on all of its Sno Balls treats after the treats tested positive for an unknown undeclared allergen.
 USA: April 14: The FDA issued a recall on all of Trader Joe's Restaurant Style White Corn Tortilla Chips due to possible contamination of undeclared dairy. The contaminated chips were produced by Snak King. The recalled chips were removed from the market after it was discovered that the chips were contaminated with undeclared dairy.
 Worldwide: May: Hyundai Motor Company recalled the Elantra, Kona, and Veloster models with a 2.0-liter engine to address a potential issue with the piston rings. The concern is that the problem could lead to increased oil consumption, progressing to a knocking sound, and the engine seizing and stalling.
 Germany: September: The KBA ordered a recall of about 200,000 Volkswagen T6.1 transporters, multivans, caravelles and California campervans that were built between 2019 and 2021. German authorities said that penetrating water at temperatures below freezing point could impair the door locking mechanism, making it appear as though the doors were locked, creating a risk that they could open unexpectedly while driving.
 USA: October: Walmart recalls The Better Homes & Gardens Lavender & Chamomile Essential Oil Infused Aromatherapy Room Spray with Gemstones, after a product sample tested positive for Burkholderia pseudomallei, a deadly bacterial infection resulting in 2 deaths.
 Worldwide: December 3: Honda Motor Co issued a major recall of 789,000 SUVs and pickup trucks because the hood could open by itself while the car was in motion, heightening the risk of an accident. It covers certain 2019 Passports, 2016 through 2019 Pilots and 2017 through 2020 Ridgeline pickups.
 USA: December 10: The Coca-Cola Company recalled Minute Maid products due to the potential presence of foreign matter, specifically metal bolts or washers.
 USA: December 21: P&G Co. issued a voluntary recall of a variety of aerosol haircare products, after benzene, a cancer-causing chemical, was detected in some stores. The affected products include dry shampoos and dry conditioners from Pantene, Aussie and Herbal Essences, produced in the U.S.
 USA: December 27: Dole Food Company recalls its packaged salad processed in the company's Bessemer City, North Carolina and Yuma, Arizona production facilities due to possible listeria monocytogenes contamination.

2022
 Indonesia: March 2022, Panasonic storage water heaters (DH-15HCMRW, DH-30HCMRW, DH-30HCDRW) are recalled due to safety issues, namely electric shock that lead of the 1 family in Pulogadung, East Jakarta, died during using the hot shower.
 Canada, USA: April 2022, Kinder brand chocolate products were recalled due to possible Salmonella contamination.
 Canada, USA: May 2022, Jif Peanut Butter products were recalled following the discovery of possible Salmonella contamination.
 Canada, USA: May 2022, Raspberries recalled due to Norovirus (unspecified as to precise date and brand information)
 Canada, USA: May 2022, It was announced on May 30 that HEB and FreshKampo strawberries recalled due to hepatitis A.
 USA: June 2022, Costco recalled 400,000 solar powered umbrellas after the Li-ion batteries would overheat and ignite.
 USA: May 2022, FDA recalled Avanos Medical’s Cortrak 2 Enteral Access System based on reports of 60 injuries and 23 patient deaths due to nasoenteric or nasogastric tube misplacements.

Recalls by industry

Automotive industry
In general, the number of recalls has been increasing – with an exception during the economic crisis of 2009–2010 – due to time, cost and market pressure. Per year, global automotive warranties are estimated as US$40 billion, 3–5% loss in sales.

Low-priced production often leads to minor quality, and outsourcing leads to a shift of knowledge concerning techniques and processes. This way, technical failures are more likely to occur due to communication problems between the different parties engaged in the supply chain and missing definitions for technical interfaces. Despite the increasing number of recalls, a Mojo Motors, Inc. study found only .005 percent of customers ask about recalls when contacting dealerships. Since 1966, 390 million motor vehicles have been recalled in the USA. 29 million cars were recalled in 2018. That number is down from its peak of 50 million in 2016, but on average, recalls are on the rise. More cars have been recalled between 2015 and 2020 than between 2003 and 2014.

Manufacturers have to notify the owner when there is a recall notice, but in the case of a second, third or fourth owner of the car, the company may be sending the notice to a previous one.

Food industry

Over 3000 food products were recalled in the US in 2016 according to the US Food and Drug Administration Enforcement reports.  Individual recall events caused by contamination from foreign bodies (physical contamination from metal, glass, plastic, wood etc.) has increased by 76% in 2016 compared with 2015.  This increase in 2016 is even more marked when looking at the number of products recalled (as opposed to recall event) due to foreign body contamination. In 2016 there were 422 products recalled due to foreign body contamination, whilst in 2015 there were 108; almost a 300% increase.

Pet food recalls
Every year, there are several pet food and treat recalls due to spoiled or tainted ingredients. Perhaps the most known was in 2007. The 2007 pet food recalls involved the massive recall of many brands of cat and dog foods beginning in March 2007. The recalls came in response to reports of renal failure in pets consuming mostly wet pet foods made with wheat gluten from a single Chinese company, beginning in February 2007. The recall began voluntarily with the Canadian company Menu Foods on March 16, 2007, when a company test showed sickness and death in some of the test animals. Overall, several major companies have recalled 150 different brands of food comprising more than 5,000 separate pet food products. The FDA and USDA investigation found the food to be intentionally contaminated with the chemical melamine.

However pet food recalls are not rare at all. The 2007 recall stands out and is well known because of the sheer size, scope, and number of animals affected. But pet food recalls occur on a regular basis. For instance, on September 12, 2008, Mars Petcare US announced a voluntary recall of all dry pet food products produced at its plant in Everson, Pennsylvania, citing potential contamination with salmonella.

Snack food recall
On July 23, 2018, Pepperidge Farm announced that the Flavor Blasted Xtra Cheddar Goldfish crackers were being recalled due to possible salmonella contamination in the whey powder used on them. This recall also affected the Flavor Blasted Sour Cream and Onion, Whole Grain Xtra Cheddar, and Xtra Cheddar and Pretzel varieties.

Also, more snack products were recalled for various safety reasons. Mondelēz Global LLC recalled all Ritz Crackers products that are containing whey after traces of salmonella were detected on the whey powder. The recall includes Ritz cheese cracker sandwiches and mixed cookie and cracker variety packs. Flower Foods recalled all of their Swiss Rolls products sold under the H-E-B, Food Lion, Mrs. Freshley's, Baker's Treat, Market Square, and Great Value brands due to contamination of salmonella. John Derst's Old Fashioned Bread was also affected by the recall. Pinnacle Foods, Inc. issued a recall on all Hungry Man BBQ boneless chicken wing products due to salmonella being detected in the whey powder of the ranch dressing.

Broadcast industry

On September 10, 2020, the frequencies of ABS-CBN Channel 2, alongside its digital channels such as Yey!, Asianovela Channel, and Movie Central, as well as terrestrial operations of cable channels such as Cine Mo!, TeleRadyo, Jeepney TV, Myx, and Knowledge Channel on ABS-CBN TV Plus, and other pertinent local TV and radio stations, were recalled by the Philippine National Telecommunications Commission citing the absence of a valid, legislative franchise. The provisional authorities and certificates of public convenience granted to ABS-CBN were also taken away by the said government agency.

See also

 Contamination control
 Duty to warn
 FDA Recall Classification Levels
 Lead poisoning
 Toy safety
 Track and trace

References

External links
 

 
Corporate scandals
Product liability
Food recalls